Louis Auguste may refer to:

 Louis Auguste, Prince of Dombes (1700–1755)
 Louis Auguste, Duke of Maine (1670–1736)